Emmochliophis is a genus of snakes in the family Colubridae. The genus is endemic to Ecuador.

Species
The genus Emmochliophis contains two species which are considered valid.
 Emmochliophis fugleri  - Pinchinda snake
 A single specimen was found in the Rio Manduriacu reserve during an amphibian and reptile survey in 2019. Only the second to be found, the first was in 1965 from lowland, humid semi-deciduous forests of the Ecuadorian Chocó, in the south of Santo Domingo de los Tsachilas province.
 Emmochliophis miops 

Nota bene: A binomial authority in parentheses indicates that the species was originally described in a genus other than Emmochliophis.

Etymology
The specific name, fugleri, is in honor of American biologist Charles M. Fugler (1929–1999).

References

Further reading
Boulenger GA (1898). "An Account of the Reptiles and Batrachians collected by Mr. W. F. H. Rosenberg in Western Ecuador". Proceedings of the Zoological Society of London 1898: 107-126 + Plates X-XVIII. (Synophis miops, new species, p. 115 + Plate XII, figure 1).
Freiberg M (1982). Snakes of South America. Hong Kong: T.F.H. Publications. 189 pp. . (Genus Emmochliophis, p. 98).
Fritts TH, Smith HM (1969). "A New Genus and Species of Snake from Western Ecuador". Transactions of the Kansas Acadademy of Science 72 (1): 60–66. (Emmocliophis, new genus; E. fugleri, new species).

Emmochliophis
Snake genera
Endemic fauna of Ecuador